Ceanothus divergens, commonly known as Calistoga ceanothus, is an evergreen shrub in the family Rhamnaceae, an endemic of California.

Description
This plant has a growth habit described as ascending to erect and may attain height.  The plant's preferred habitat is on shrub-covered, rocky, volcanic slopes.  The hermaphrodite blue or purple flowers bloom in April and May.

The sub-globose fruits  are five to six millimeters in diameter.

Distribution
Occurrence is primarily in the Northern California Coast Ranges, such as near Calistoga, at altitudes of less than 500 meters.

References

External links
Plant profile for Ceanothus divergens

divergens
Endemic flora of California
Natural history of Sonoma County, California